Bullet Points can refer to:
"Bullet Points" (Breaking Bad), a season four episode of Breaking Bad
Bullet Points (comics), a comic book limited series

See also
Bullet (typography), a symbol used in lists of items, also known as a bullet point